Carlberg is a surname. Notable people with the surname include:

Anders Carlberg (1943–2013), Swedish politician and writer
Carl-Ehrenfried Carlberg (1889–1962), Swedish gymnast who competed in the 1912 Summer Olympics
Carsten Carlberg (born 1963), German biochemist
Elisabeth Rehn (born 1935) née Carlberg, Finnish politician
Eric Carlberg (1880–1963), Swedish sport shooter, fencer, and modern pentathlete who competed in the four Olympics
Gotthold Carlberg (1838–1881), musician
Kevin Carlberg (died 2009), musician
Norman Carlberg (born 1928), American sculptor and printmaker
Pelle Carlberg (born 1969), Swedish singer/songwriter
Peter Carlberg (born 1950), Swedish actor
Vilhelm Carlberg (1880–1970), Swedish sports shooter and Olympic Champion